Joseph Lawrence Roth (May 29, 1955 – February 19, 1977) was a college football player and All-American quarterback at the University of California, Berkeley. Roth played the 1976 season knowing he was dying of melanoma; he died in February 1977, three months after his last regular season game and just weeks after playing an all-star game in Japan. His jersey, number 12, is the only one ever retired by the California Golden Bears football program.

Biography
A 1973 graduate of Granite Hills High School in El  Cajon, Roth led Grossmont College of El Cajon to an undefeated season and state title in 1974, and transferred to the University of California, Berkeley in 1975.
Originally a back-up, he started the fourth game of the 1975 season, and led the Golden Bears to the Pac-8 title as co-champions. Cal led the nation in total offense, gaining the same yardage both passing and rushing with 2,522 yards each.

In 1976, Roth was a pre-season favorite for the Heisman Trophy. The season was more tumultuous, and towards the end of the year Roth's performance started to drop, but he was named an All-American and finished ninth in the Heisman Trophy voting.

After the season ended, he revealed that halfway through it he had been diagnosed with terminal melanomaapparently the metastasis of a mole removed from his face several years earlier.  Despite his deteriorating physical condition, he honored his commitments to play in both the Hula Bowl and the Japan Bowl.
According to a friend's reminiscence, during the Japan Bowl festivities Roth had agreed to sit for a thirty-minute autograph session; but finding, at the end of the scheduled time, hundreds of children still waiting, he continued to sign until every child had an autograph, after which he left the building and vomited. 

By mid-February he was in the hospital, where (in the words of the San Francisco Chronicle)

Roth died at age 21 on February 19, 1977.

Honors

NFL commissioner Pete Rozelle opened the 1977 NFL Draft in early May with a moment of silence for Roth.

Posthumously, Roth received the Berkeley Citation in 1977, awarded to those "whose attainments significantly exceed the standards of excellence in their fields and whose contributions to UC Berkeley are manifestly above and beyond the call of duty." In 2000, he was inducted into the University of California Athletic Hall of Fame.
Several awards are named for him, including the Joe Roth Award, for the high school player in the San Diego area who best demonstrates courage; the Joe Roth Memorial Award, given to the San Diego County junior college football player who best exemplifies high academic standards and athletic excellence; the Joe Roth Memorial Award, which was given as the MVP award for the Japan Bowl; and the Joe Roth Award, given to the Cal football player who best demonstrates courage, attitude, and sportsmanship.

Cal football designates each year's home game against either USC or UCLA as the Joe Roth Memorial Game. Cal wore throwback uniforms similar to those the Bears wore during Roth's career for the 2007 Roth Memorial Game and will continue to do so, starting in 2017. The Bears also occasionally wear Roth-era road throwbacks when playing at USC and UCLA.

A documentary, Don't Quit: The Joe Roth Story, was released in 2015.

References

Further reading
 
 
 
 
 

1955 births
1977 deaths
American football quarterbacks
California Golden Bears football players
Grossmont Griffins football players
Players of American football from San Diego
Deaths from melanoma
Deaths from cancer in California